Lillooet is a town in the Fraser Canyon in British Columbia.

Lillooet may also refer to:

The St'at'imc people, also known as the Lillooet people
The Lillooet language, also known under the names St'at'imcets and Ucwalmícwts
The Lillooet Tribal Council, which is the usual English name for the largest tribal council of the St'at'imc people
the Lillooet Indian Band is the former (though still used), name for the government now known as T'it'q'et First Nation
Lillooet is found on many geographic features:

The Lillooet River, a tributary of the Fraser River
Lillooet Lake, a lake on the Lillooet River
The Lillooet Ranges, a subdivision of the Coast Mountains
The Lillooet Icecap an icefield in the Coast Mountains, about 200k north of Vancouver and at the head of the Lillooet and Bridge Rivers
The Lillooet Glacier, a tongue of the Lillooet Icecap which is the source of the Lillooet River

The Lillooet Country, a region in the Southern Interior of British Columbia

It is also common in administrative names:

the Squamish-Lillooet Regional District is a regional district in British Columbia, Canada
the Lillooet Land District is a legal land-survey region of British Columbia dating to the founding of the colony in 1858 used in all property and legal documents
Yale-Lillooet was a provincial electoral district or "riding" in British Columbia which superseded:
Lillooet (electoral district) was a historical provincial electoral district 1871–1890 and 1903–1966. It was among the province's original twelve ridings
Lillooet West (electoral district) was a historical provincial electoral district in the 1894, 1898 and 1890 British Columbia elections
Lillooet East (electoral district) was a historical provincial electoral district in the 1894, 1898 and 1890 British Columbia elections
and parts of the original Yale riding
NB the original federal district including the town and area of Lillooet was Cariboo